A partial solar eclipse occurred on March 5, 1924. A solar eclipse occurs when the Moon passes between Earth and the Sun, thereby totally or partly obscuring the image of the Sun for a viewer on Earth. A partial solar eclipse occurs in the polar regions of the Earth when the center of the Moon's shadow misses the Earth.

Related eclipses

Solar eclipses 1921–1924

References

External links 

1924 3 5
1924 3 5
1924 in science
March 1924 events